is a type of Japanese pottery traditionally made in Fukuchi, Tagawa District, Fukuoka.

History 
Agano ware has its beginnings in 1602, when artisans arrived in Japan from the Kingdom of Joseon in Korea by invitation from the daimyo of Kokura Domain. The beginnings of its production was supported by Hosokawa Sansai, who was otherwise known as the daimyō Hosokawa Tadaoki.  It was originally associated with the tea ceremony.

Agano Kawara ware (上野香春焼) is a type of Agano ware traditionally made in Kawara, Fukuoka Prefecture.

Images

References

Further reading

External links 

 http://www.aganoyaki.or.jp/

Culture in Fukuoka Prefecture
Japanese pottery